Baptist Chapel Church and Cemetery is a historic Baptist church and cemetery located near Helton, Ashe County, North Carolina. It was built in 1872, and is a simple one-story frame structure, covered by weatherboards and set on a common bond brick foundation.

It was listed on the National Register of Historic Places in 1976.

References

External links
 

Baptist churches in North Carolina
Baptist cemeteries in the United States
Cemeteries on the National Register of Historic Places in North Carolina
Churches on the National Register of Historic Places in North Carolina
Churches in Ashe County, North Carolina
National Register of Historic Places in Ashe County, North Carolina